A judge is an official who presides over a court.

Judge or Judges may also refer to:

Roles  
Judge, an alternative name for an adjudicator in a competition in theatre, music, sport, etc.
Judge, an alternative name/aviator call sign for a member of the Judge Advocate General's Corps, U.S. Navy
Judge, an alternative name for a sports linesman, referee or umpire 
 Biblical judges, an office of authority in the early history of Israel

Places
 Judge, Minnesota, a community in the United States
 Judge, Missouri, a community in the United States
 The Judge (British Columbia), a mountain in the Columbia Mountains of Canada

People 
 Judge (surname)
 Judge Jules, professional name of British DJ and record producer Julius O'Riordan

Arts, entertainment, and media

Fictional characters
 Judge (Buffyverse), a demon in the television series Buffy The Vampire Slayer
 Archadian Judges, from the game Final Fantasy XII
 Judge Holden, from Cormac McCarthy's novel Blood Meridian

Films
 The Judge (1960 film), a Swedish drama 
 The Judge (1984 film), a French crime drama
 The Judge (2014 film), an American drama film
 The Judge, a 2017 documentary about Kholoud Faqih

Other arts, entertainment, and media
 Judge (band), a hardcore punk band from New York City
 Judge (magazine), a late 19th-century United States publication
 Judge (manga), a 1989 manga series
 Judge (novel), a 2008 novel by Karen Traviss
 The Judge (TV series), a syndicated television drama that ran from 1986 to 1992 starring Bob Shield as Judge Robert J. Franklin
 Judge (2000 AD), a fictional office in the Judge Dredd comic strip
 Jydge, a 2017 video game
 Judge, a 1980 Game & Watch game

Other uses 
 Book of Judges, seventh book of the Hebrew Bible and the Christian Old Testament
 Brandeis Judges, the varsity athletics teams at Brandeis University
 Judge (Magic: the Gathering), a tournament official in the collectible card game
 Pontiac GTO Judge, a 1970s American automobile
 Taurus Judge, a revolver that fires .45 Colt and .410 bore ammunition

See also
 The Judge (disambiguation)